Carabus gigas is a species of beetles of the family Carabidae.

Description
The upper surface is black and glossy. The elytrtra are oval, strongly convex and covered with about 15 rows of more or less small tubercles. Also the pronotum has a granular surface. The adults reach the age of 3 years or more. These beetles primarily feed on snails.

Distribution
This species is endemic to Europe and occurs in South-East Europe and in Central Europe, the range extends into Styria and Carinthia. It is observed in Albania, Austria, Bosnia and Herzegovina, Bulgaria, Croatia, mainland Greece, Hungary, mainland Italy, North Macedonia, Romania, Republic of Moldova, Serbia and Slovenia.

Habitat
Carabus gigas lives in moist and subalpine highlands.

Subspecies
 Carabus g. duponcheli, Dejean, 1831 (Southern Greece)
 Carabus g. parnassicus, Kraatz, 1884 (Greece, North Macedonia, southern Albania)

Gallery

References

External links
 
 
 Carabus gigas on Fauna Europaea
 Biolib
 Carabidae of the world 

gigas
Beetles of Europe
Beetles described in 1799